Gonidomus is a genus of air-breathing land snails, terrestrial pulmonate gastropod mollusks in the subfamily Orthogibbinae of the family Streptaxidae.

Distribution
The genus Gonidomus was endemic to Mauritius and it is now extinct.

Species
Species within the genus Gonidomus include:
 Gonidomus concamerata (Wood, 1828)
 † Gonidomus newtoni Adams, 1867
 (extant or extinct) Gonidomus sulcatus Peile, 1936

References

 Férussac A.E.J.P.J.F. d’A , 1821 Tableaux systématiques des animaux mollusques classés en familles naturelles, dans lesquels on a établi la concordance de tous les systèmes; suivis d'un prodrome générale pour tous les mollusques terrestres ou fluviatiles, vivants ou fossiles. Deuxième partie. (Première section.). Tableaux particuliers des mollusques terrestres et fluviatiles, présentant pour chaque famille les genres et espèces qui la composent. Classe des gastéropodes. Ordre des pulmonés sans opercules. II. Tableau systématique des Limaçons, Cochleae. III. Tableau systématique des pulmonés géhydrophiles. 114 p. [folio edition; January], 111 p. [quarto edition; June]
 Bank, R. A. (2017). Classification of the Recent terrestrial Gastropoda of the World. Last update: 16 July 2017

External links
 Pfeiffer, L. (1855-1856). Versuch einer Anordnung der Heliceen nach natürlichen Gruppen. Malakozoologische Blätter. 2(3): 112 (September 1855); 2(4): 113–144 (December 1855); 2(5) ("1855"): 145–185 (January 1856)

Streptaxidae
Extinct gastropods
Taxonomy articles created by Polbot
Gastropod genera